The Audubon Naturalist Society of the Central Atlantic States (Audubon Naturalist Society) (ANS) is an American non-profit environmental organization dedicated to conservation and education.  Until 1959, the organization was known as the Audubon Society of the District of Columbia.  The organization holds three properties in the Washington, D.C. metropolitan area as wildlife sanctuaries, two in Virginia along with its headquarters in Maryland.  In October 2022. membership voted to change the name of the organization to Nature Forward.

History
The first Audubon Society of the District of Columbia was organized in 1897 by Mrs. John Dewhurst Patten "for the protection and study of birds".  It was one of many local groups organized in the late nineteenth and early twentieth centuries as part of the Audubon movement. Its first president was George M. Sternberg; the Executive Committee of fifteen members included Florence Augusta Merriam, Leland Ossian Howard, and Theodore Sherman Palmer.  Robert Ridgway was named one of several honorary vice presidents, and designed a pin for the society.  Olive Thorne Miller wrote one of the group's earliest leaflets.  In the Society's first year, it printed and circulated a leaflet published by its counterpart organization in New York.

Early goals of the organization were to educate children about the value of birds and to curtail the use of bird feathers in millinery. Frank M. Chapman gave the inaugural lecture, "Woman as Bird Enemy", addressing the fashion for trimming hat with feathers.  However, most of the active members of the early Society were women.

Theodore Roosevelt was an active member of the Society; during his presidency the organization occasionally met at the White House.

Sternberg was succeeded as president of the organization by Judge Barnard of the Supreme Court of the District; following Barnard's death in 1923, Palmer served as president.

In the years following World War II, Irston Barnes (president 1946–1962), Roger Tory Peterson, and Louis Halle rejuvenated the organization and strengthened its voice on regional conservation issues.  The Society was incorporated in 1947, and new by-laws replaced the Executive Committee with an annually elected Board of Directors.  Board members during this period included Paul Bartsch, William Vogt, and in the 1950s, Howard Zahniser. Rachel Carson served on the board from 1948 to 1950, and from 1955; she chaired the publications committee and wrote book reviews and other pieces for ANS's Wood Thrush (later, Atlantic Naturalist).

In December 1959, the organization adopted its present name, the Audubon Naturalist Society of the Central Atlantic States, Inc. (ANS).

In 1969, ANS moved to its present headquarters at Woodend Sanctuary, a bequest of Mrs. Chester Wells; the property comprises 40 acres in Chevy Chase, Maryland and a 30-room mansion.

C&O Canal controversy 
The Chesapeake and Ohio Canal was acquired by the federal government in 1938 as settlement of a debt.  Maintaining the canal was thought to be too expensive, and soon plans were in place to convert all or part of the corridor to a parkway.  However, in 1953, opposition to the parkway began to mount.  The Society and its president Barnes joined the dissent; Barnes wrote an influential article for the Washington Post, arguing for restoring the canal and converting its towpath to a hiking trail.  He chaired the newly formed Potomac Valley Conservation and Recreation Council to promote conservation in the valley and oppose the road project, which was ultimately shelved.

Programs
Although its original focus was birds, Audubon Naturalist Society has been active in several areas of wildlife conservation, protection of habitat, and control of pollution.  Past conservation activities include successful efforts to block road construction through Rock Creek and Glover-Archbold Parks.  The Society has also been active in preserving Dyke Marsh and working to protect golden and bald eagles.  In 2007, the Society opposed construction of Maryland Route 200 (often known as the Intercounty Connector), bringing an unsuccessful suit in federal court against the project.  In 2013, ANS joined opposition to development in the watershed of Ten Mile Creek.

Sanctuaries 
ANS manages two properties as wildlife sanctuaries: the headquarters property of Woodend and the 68-acre Rust Nature Sanctuary in Leesburg, Virginia.  In fiscal year 2013, ANS entered into a partnership with the Northern Virginia Regional Park Authority (NOVA Parks) for the operation of Rust Sanctuary: NOVA Parks will maintain the buildings and grounds and ANS will continue to offer educational programming at the site.  In addition to trails and classrooms, the Woodend facility provides a shop offering books, sport optics, birdfeeding supplies, gifts, and items for children.

Education 
The Society offers a range of summer camps and other activities for children and families, as well as outreach programs to local schools and training for teachers.  Free birding walks are held monthly.  For adults, ANS offers classes and workshops, training in stream water quality monitoring, local field trips, nature travel to locations like Costa Rica, and a certificate program in Natural History Field Studies, co-sponsored by Graduate School USA.

Publications 
The Society's current publication is Naturalist Quarterly.

In 1948, Shirley Briggs became the first editor of ANS's Wood Thrush.  The periodical was soon renamed Atlantic Naturalist, and it appeared under that name from 1950 to 1976.  Atlantic Naturalist published work by some of the country's leading nature writers, conservationists, and naturalists, among them Carson, Peterson, Halle, Zahniser, Stewart Udall, William O. Douglas, and Chandler Robbins.  It was succeeded by the Audubon Naturalist News. By 2009, the News was on a quarterly publication schedule.  With the Spring 2011 issue (volume 37, number 2), it was renamed Naturalist Quarterly, incorporating the Society's catalog of environmental educational programs into its coverage of ANS people and events and local conservation activities.

Awards 
From time to time, ANS grants the Paul Bartsch Award for distinguished contributions to natural history.  The award honors mid-Atlantic resident Bartsch, curator for the Smithsonian Institution, ANS board member, and frequent contributor to Atlantic Naturalist.  Past recipients include Carson (1963), Peterson, Robbins, Briggs (1972), Alexander Wetmore (1964), David Brower (1967), Claudia Wilds, Clarence Cottam, Donald Messersmith (2002), and Lawrence Zeleny.

Name change
In the 2020s reappraisal of figures involved with slavery, ANS announced in October 2021 that it would change its name to remove the reference to John James Audubon, who owned slaves, opposed the abolition of slavery, and wrote about the inferiority of Black and Indigenous people.  The organization sought a name "that better reflects the growing, rich diversity of the region that we serve," looking "forward toward a stronger, more inclusive future."  In October 2022. membership voted to change the name of the organization to Nature Forward.

Similar organizations
The present Audubon Society of the District of Columbia (DC Audubon), established in 1999, is a local chapter of the National Audubon Society. Audubon Naturalist Society is not directly affiliated with the national organization.

The National Audubon Society also maintains a public policy office in Washington, D.C., as well as other local chapters around the metropolitan area.

References

Bibliography

External links
 https://natureforward.org/
 Video: Lisa Alexander and Kathy Rushing discuss strategic planning for the organization, refocusing on Washington metro area, new partnership for Rust Sanctuary
 Presentation by Diane Cameron to the Montgomery County, Maryland Planning Board on Ten Mile Creek

Audubon movement
Ornithological organizations in the United States
Bird conservation organizations
Environmental organizations based in Maryland